The New Zealand telephone numbering plan describes the allocation of telephone numbers in New Zealand and the Pitcairn Islands.

History
By the 1970s, New Zealand's telephone network consisted primarily of step-by-step telephone exchanges or, in the main centres, a mixture of rotary and step-by-step exchanges, with a few rural areas still served by manual exchanges. Local telephone number lengths varied from 3 to 6 digits depending on the size of exchange and population of the local calling area. Numerous complex dialling instructions appeared in the front of telephone books explaining the number sequences needed to reach subscribers in local "free calling" areas, and in a few cases for short-distance toll calls (usually to the local city or town), which were recorded on manually read meters in some step-by-step local exchanges. Local calls were free (and still are for residential customers). Long distance (toll) calls required the manual intervention of an operator, who had access to toll circuits, either via an operator's cord board or a toll exchange (switch). Access to the toll operator was by dialling 0. Local directory service could be accessed via 100, telephone faults via 120, and emergency services by dialling 111.

Crossbar exchanges were installed from the 1970s, and electronic exchanges from 1982.

Subscriber toll dialling (the historical codes)
Subscriber toll dialling (STD) was introduced in the New Zealand telephone network in the mid-1970s, a result of the introduction of NEC crossbar-based toll exchanges and their ability to perform number translation. One still needed to dial 0 to make a toll call, but instead of calling the operator, one could then dial the STD number directly. Access to the operator was via 010, while other service numbers remained unchanged.

The original STD codes were numbered roughly south to north, with a few exceptions. A complete list of STD codes from 1987 is below:

STD codes were assigned with larger areas having short STD codes (e.g. Auckland - 09), while smaller areas had longer STD codes and shorter local numbers (e.g. Shannon - 06927). The total number length, that is STD code and local number excluding the first 0, usually totalled seven digits, but could vary up to nine, as exchanges often increased the length of local numbers to accommodate new lines.

Reorganisation
With the introduction of NEC stored program control exchanges in the New Zealand telephone network during the 1980s, and the rapid growth in demand, the breakup of the New Zealand Post Office and the creation of Telecom, local telephone numbers were standardised to seven digits. In many parts of the country, the old area code was incorporated into the new number, however in some areas the numbers changed completely.

At the same time, the opportunity was taken to move directory service from 100 to 018 and charge for directory service calls. The justification for doing so was the introduction of a directory service computer system that gave access to current New Zealand telephone number listings, not just those printed in the telephone book, and the need for a separate user pays revenue stream for Telecom Directory Services, which was separate to the 5 regional (local) telephone companies, TNI and Telecom Mobile that Telecom had split itself into, as part of the sale of Telecom and deregulation of New Zealand telecommunications services.

Since 1993, land-line telephone numbers in New Zealand consist of a single-digit area code and a seven-digit local number, of which the first three digits generally specify the exchange and the final four specify the subscriber's unique line at that exchange.

International number lengths
The long-distance trunk prefix, 0, which is prepended to national numbers, is not part of the international number.

The minimum number length after the international prefix is three digits. Most numbers, other than service numbers have at least eight digits.

The maximum number length after the international prefix is nine digits, except numbers starting with 210 (which have ten digits).

Present numbering plan
New Zealand follows an open numbering plan. The country code is 64. The long distance dialing prefix is 0 and the international prefix is 00.

Landlines

New Zealand landline phone numbers have a total of eight digits, excluding the leading 0: a one-digit area code, and a seven-digit phone number (e.g. 09 700 1234), beginning with a digit between 2 and 9 (but excluding 900, 911, and 999 due to misdial guards).
There are five regional area codes: 3, 4, 6, 7, and 9. These must be dialled, along with the domestic trunk prefix, when calling a recipient outside the local calling area of which the caller is located. For example, one calling Dunedin from Christchurch must dial 03, even though Christchurch is 03 as well.

The combined domestic trunk prefix and area codes are:
02 409 for Ross Dependency (Year-round direct dial access to Scott Base & U.S. McMurdo Station - Summer-only access to Zucchelli Station )
03 for the entire South Island and the Chatham Islands
04 for the Wellington metro area and Kapiti Coast district (excluding Otaki)
06 for Taranaki, Manawatū-Whanganui (excluding Taumarunui and National Park), Hawke's Bay, Gisborne, the Wairarapa, and Otaki.
07 for the Waikato (excluding Tuakau and Pokeno)  and the Bay of Plenty
09 for Auckland, Northland, Tuakau and Pokeno.

Mobile phones
Telephone numbers for mobile phones begin with 02, followed by seven to nine digits (usually eight). The first few digits after the 02 indicate the original mobile network that issued the number.

Telephone numbers must always be dialled in full for mobile phones. In the late 1990s however, Telecom mobile phones could dial other Telecom mobile phones without the (then) 025 prefix, making 025 act like a landline area code.

The introduction of mobile number portability on  meant that an increasing number of mobiles would be operating on a different network from that which originally assigned the number.
To find out whether a particular number belongs to a specific network provider, one can text the mobile number of interest to 300. It is a free service provided by 2degrees. A reply will be sent to verify whether the number is operating on their network or not. , this service will work for Vodafone and Spark Active.

Other numbers

Toll-free and premium-rate calls
Toll-free numbers begin with 0508 or 0800, followed by usually six but sometimes seven digits.
Premium-rate services use the code 0900 followed by five digits (some with six digits).
Local-rate numbers, such as Internet access numbers, have the prefix 08xx, and are usually followed by five digits.

0508 Tollfree sold by many network operators (originally launched by Clear Communications as a competitor to the then Telecom-only 0800 range)
0800 Tollfree sold by many network operators (originally only available to Telecom NZ, now known as Spark)
08xy Various non-geographic services
083210 Call Minder answerphone service
08322 Infocall numbers
0867 Dial-up Internet numbers (retired)
0900 Premium rate services

Service numbers
Numbers beginning with 01 are for operator services.

010 National Operator
0170 International Operator
0172 International Directory Service
018 National Directory Service

The "1" codes are used for local services, including activating exchange features. The emergency services number is "111".

105 Police non-emergency number.
111 Emergency Services Operator (all telephones; forwarded to Fire, Police or Ambulance as required).
112 Emergency Services Operator for GSM Mobiles (only) - not advertised.
11x Not allocatable. Used internally for specific emergency services.
12x Spark repair and sales services.
13–19 Various uses, mainly exchange service.

The mobile network also recognises telephone numbers starting with *, including:

*123 Spark Mobile Sales and Service
*200 2degrees Mobile Sales & Service
*222 Automobile Association Roadside Service
*500 Coastguard Marine Assistance
*555 Traffic Safety Services (Police non-emergency traffic calls)

Text message numbers for mobile phones are 3 or 4 digits long.

Other useful numbers
 07 832 0000 - automated information (free call) who your toll provider is
 1956 - reads back the number the user is calling from (includes the area code "3" 7654321). (not TelstraClear/Vodafone)
 1957 - reads back the number the user is calling from (without the area code e.g. 7654321). (not TelstraClear/Vodafone)
 1958 - sends back the number the user is calling from in DTMF tones. (not TelstraClear/Vodafone)
 511 - reads back the number the user is calling from (TelstraClear/Vodafone only)
 083201234 - reads back the pilot number of the line the user is calling from (if calling from a business line in a stepping group) or the individual number on the Telstra/Vodafone network.
 083201231 - reads back the pilot number as above, with area code.
 083201232 - returns the DTMF tones of the line called from.
 137 - ringer test (ringback number); Pick up phone handset, dial 137, hang up, the phone will ring, pick up handset to cancel.
 0196 - Dialed before numbers to show caller ID if it is disabled for outgoing calls on number you are calling from.
 0197 - Dialled before any normal phone number disables caller ID for the receiving party. (not Spark currently, possibly discontinued for others)
 #31# - Dialled before any normal phone number disables caller ID for the receiving party.
 *32 - Dialled before any normal phone number disables caller ID for the receiving party. (TelstraClear/Vodafone only)
 *67 - Dialled before any normal phone number disables caller ID for the receiving party. (Voyager)

Fictional numbers
New Zealand has no dedicated series of fictional telephone numbers. Television shows and movies generally use any available range of numbers (e.g. the TVNZ soap opera Shortland Street uses the unassigned (09) 4299 number range.).

Proposed area codes
In the future (particularly by the 2030s), there are additional proposed area codes of New Zealand separating for most regions: 02 (for Canterbury Region, Otago and Southland), 03 (for Marlborough District, West Coast, Nelson and Tasman District), 05 (for Taranaki and Manawatū-Whanganui), 06 (for Hawke's Bay, Gisborne,  Wairarapa and Otaki), 07 (for the Waikato including Hamilton and Taupō) and 08 (for the Bay of Plenty including Tauranga and Rotorua).

See also
List of dialling codes in New Zealand
Telecommunications in New Zealand

References

Notes

External links
Ministry of Economic Development information to ITU
Number Administration Deed (NAD)
Number Register maintained by the NAD (Current information)
Telephone Numbering Scheme , Access Codes Allocation  and National Toll Codes  from Telecom New Zealand website  (Older information)

 
New Zealand
Telecommunications in New Zealand
Telephone numbers